NCOSE can refer to:

National Center on Sexual Exploitation
International Council on Systems Engineering